The Torceşti gas field natural gas field in Torceşti near Adjud in Vrancea County. It was discovered in 2007 and developed by Petrom.  It began production in 2008 and produces natural gas and condensates. The total proven reserves of the Torceşti gas field are around 52 billion cubic feet (1.5 km³), and production is slated to be around 4.6 million cubic feet/day (0.13×105m³) in 2008.

References

Natural gas fields in Romania